Gurpreet Kaur Sapra is an Indian Administrative Service officer and the District Commissioner of Mohali, Ajitgarh .

References

Year of birth missing (living people)
Indian Administrative Service officers
Living people